Paul Brock is an Irish button accordionist born in Athlone now residing in Ennis. In May 1989, Brock co-founded the group Moving Cloud with fiddle player, Manus McGuire. In 2001 he co-founded the new group The Brock McGuire Band also with Manus McGuire. In 2004, Brock was voted Best Male Musician by the Irish American News. His recent album Humdinger with fellow band member Enda Scahill was voted Irish Music Album of The Year by the Irish Times and has been released by Compass Records.

Discography
Green Grass Blue Grass
Humdinger
Brock McGuire Band
Mo Chairdin
Tribute to Joe Cooley (with Frankie Gavin)
Moving Cloud
Foxglove
Hands Across The Water

References
 Corofin Trad Festival bio
The Irish Music Magazine Charts
Irish Music Review
Irish Times Review

External links
Paul Brock & Enda Scahill

Irish accordionists
Living people
Musicians from County Clare
Musicians from County Westmeath
People from Athlone
People from Ennis
21st-century accordionists
Year of birth missing (living people)